Antonio Rojas (born March 27, 1984) is a Paraguayan footballer, who currently plays for IK Wormo as a midfielder.

Career 
Antonio Rojas started his career in Paraguayan club Club Cerro Porteño before his cousin Tim had Rojas come and play with him in Denmark Series side Helsingør IF. After that he spent a short period in Hellerup IK before moving to Sweden and Division 2 Mellersta Götaland club Lunds BK. His time with the team was again short as he left after the first season for Ängelholms FF in Division 1 Södra where he helped the club get promoted to second tier Superettan the following year. In the summer of 2010 he suffered a knee injury which forced him to have an operation that caused him to miss the rest of the season.

Rojas returned from injury for the 2011 season where he helped the team reach third place which meant a promotion playoff to Allsvenskan against Allsvenskan 14th placed team Syrianska FC. An injury prevented him from participating in the matches. Ängelholm won the first game 2-1, but Syrianska won the return leg with 3-1 and remained in Allsvenskan. At half-time newly relegated Halmstads BK announced that they had signed Antonio Rojas.

In 2011, he established himself as a vital playmaker on the midfield and a penalty taker. When Rojas signed for Halmstads BK, he stated he would play in Allsvenskan with Halmstad either 2013 or 2014. In his first season with the club Halmstad missed out on the top two automatic promotion positions and ended up in third place which meant another promotion playoff. Through their 6-4 aggregate victory against GIF Sundsvall they were able to return to Allsvenskan.

References

External links 
  
  (archive)
  (archive)

1984 births
Living people
Paraguayan footballers
Association football midfielders
Paraguayan expatriate footballers
Paraguayan Primera División players
Superettan players
Allsvenskan players
Cerro Porteño players
Hellerup IK players
Ängelholms FF players
Halmstads BK players
Expatriate footballers in Sweden